A meeting point, meeting place, or assembly point is a geographically defined place where people meet. Such a meeting point is often a landmark that has become popular and is a convenient place for both tourists and citizens to meet. Examples of meeting points include public areas and facilities such as squares, statues, parks, amusement parks, railway stations, airports, etc. or officially designated and signed points in such public facilities. There is often a public sign designating an official meeting point in public facilities (see illustrations).

Especially when called an assembly point, a meeting point is a designated (safe) place where people can gather or must report to during an emergency or a fire drill etc.

In sociology, a meeting point is a place where a group of people meet on a regular basis, for example, a group of regulars or people with a special interest or background. These meeting points are in designated private rooms, in a part of a park, or in a café.

Examples of well-known meeting points

Australia
 Brisbane - Hungry Jack's on Queen Street Mall.
 Melbourne - "Under the Clocks" at Flinders Street station
 Adelaide - "Malls Balls" at Rundle Mall
 Sydney - "Town Hall Steps" at Sydney Town Hall

Denmark
 Copenhagen - "Under uret" - Under the clock - at Københavns Hovedbanegård.

Nicaragua
 El Ostional - "Centro Ole" - Ole Center - at O Parks, WildLife, and Recreation.

Sweden

 Svampen, "the mushroom", a mushroom shaped structure on Stureplan, Stockholm.
 Ringen på centralen, "the ring at the central station", a fenced, circle-shaped opening between two levels at the Central Station, Stockholm.

Poland

 Wrocław, there are two popular meeting spots on Wrocław's Market Square - "the pillory" and statue of Aleksander Fredro.

United States 

 Grand Central Terminal clock in New York City

References

Meetings
Safety